Sheila Janet Carey MBE, (née Taylor; born 12 August 1946) is a retired British middle-distance runner who represented the United Kingdom at the 1968 and 1972 Summer Olympics. In 1968, she placed fourth in the 800 metres, while in 1972, she finishing fifth in the 1500 metres, setting a new British record. She represented England at the Commonwealth Games in 1970 and 1974. She was also part of the British 4×800 metres relay team that twice broke the world record in 1970.

Career

At the 1968 Olympics in Mexico, Carey (competing under her maiden name) placed fourth in the 800 m. In June 1970, in Edinburgh, the UK 4 × 800 m relay quartet of Rosemary Stirling, Carey, Pat Lowe and Lillian Board, broke the world record with 8:27.0. Then in September at the Crystal Palace, London, the quartet of Stirling, Georgena Craig, Lowe and Carey, improved the record to 8:25.0. In between these performances, Carey competed at the Commonwealth Games in July, held in Edinburgh. She finished eighth in the 800 m final, after a fall.

Carey competed at the 1972 Olympics in Munich, where she came in fifth in the 1500 m, setting a new British record at 4:04.8. This time remained Carey's best and as of 2013, ranked 19th on the UK all-time list. The race was won by Lyudmila Bragina and saw more than five runners beating the pre-Games world record.

Carey continued to represent the UK at international level through 1973 and 1974. She ran her lifetime best for the mile, with 4:37.16 at the Crystal Palace in September 1973, where she finished second behind Joan Allison. She made her final appearance at the 1974 Commonwealth Games in Christchurch, New Zealand. There she was eliminated in her heat of the 800 m in 2:09.16.

After retiring from international athletics Carey later went on to teach in the United Kingdom, working for many years at Exhall Grange School, a school for children with sight loss and other disabilities, near Coventry in 1987. She has been part-time at the school since 2006. Carey runs the U2 Track and Field Club and organises competitions for the sports charity British Blind Sport. In 2012, she carried the Olympic torch through Warwick as part of the relay ahead of the London Olympic Games. Her school also did a mini version of the Olympic Games.

She was appointed Member of the Order of the British Empire (MBE) in the 2013 New Year Honours for services to disability athletics. In January 2013, Exhall Grange had a special assembly congratulating her for this. She received her award in March, where she was accompanied by her husband, one of her two daughters and one of the school's former members of staff.

They also have four grandchildren.

References

External links

Sheila Carey at sporting-heroes.net

1946 births
Living people
Sportspeople from Coventry
English female middle-distance runners
Olympic athletes of Great Britain
Athletes (track and field) at the 1968 Summer Olympics
Athletes (track and field) at the 1972 Summer Olympics
Commonwealth Games competitors for England
Athletes (track and field) at the 1970 British Commonwealth Games
Athletes (track and field) at the 1974 British Commonwealth Games
World record setters in athletics (track and field)
Members of the Order of the British Empire